A list of Kannada language films produced in the Kannada cinema in India in the year 2021.

Box office collection

January – March

April – June

July – September

October – December

Dubbed Films

References

External links 
 Kannada Upcoming Releases

2021
Lists of 2021 films by country or language
2021 in Indian cinema